This is a list of moderate to large earthquakes that have occurred in Utah. Only earthquakes with a magnitude of 5.0 or greater are listed. Aftershocks are not included, unless they were of great significance or contributed to a death toll. Earthquakes occur frequently in Utah, though they tend to be small (below a 5.0 magnitude).

The highest-risk zone is along the Wasatch Front, where most of the state's population is located. The larger cities include the state's capital, Salt Lake City, as well as Lehi, Ogden, Orem, Provo, Sandy, and West Valley City.

Chronological list

See also
 List of earthquakes in Nevada

References

 
Utah
Earthquakes